was the 80th emperor of Japan, according to the traditional order of succession. His reign spanned the years from 1168 through 1180.

Genealogy
Before his ascension to the Chrysanthemum Throne, his personal name (his imina) was Norihito-shinnō (憲仁親王).  He was also known as Nobuhito-shinnō.

Takakura was the fourth son of Emperor Go-Shirakawa, and thus uncle to his predecessor, Emperor Rokujō. His mother was Empress Dowager Taira no Shigeko, the younger sister of Taira no Tokiko, the concubine of Taira no Kiyomori.  His empress consort was Taira no Tokuko (later Empress Dowager Kenrei), the regent of Taira no Kiyomori, and thus his first cousin (as his mother and Tokuko's mothers were sisters).

 Empress consort: Taira no Tokuko (平徳子) – later Kenreimon-in
 First Son: Imperial Prince Tokihito (言仁親王) – later Emperor Antoku

 Lady-in-waiting: Bōmon Shokushi (坊門殖子; 1157–1228) later Shichijō-in (七条院), Bomon Nobutaka's daughter
 Second son: Imperial Prince Morisada (守貞親王; 1179–1223) – later Go-Takakura In (後高倉院) – father of Emperor Go-Horikawa
 Fourth son: Imperial Prince Takahira (尊成親王) – later Emperor Go-Toba

 Consort: Konoe Michiko (近衛通子; b. 1163) or Rokujō-no-tsubone (六条局), Konoe Motozane’s daughter.

 Lady-in-waiting: Horikawa Toyoko (堀河豊子) or Azechi-Naishi (按察典侍), Horikawa Yorisada’s daughter
 Third daughter: Imperial Princess Kiyoko (潔子内親王; b. 1179) – Saigū of Ise

 Court Lady: Taira no Noriko (平範子) or Shōshō-Naishi (少将内侍), Taira Yoshisuke’s daughter
 Third son: Imperial Prince Koreaki (惟明親王; 1172–1221) later Imperial Prince Priest Shōen (聖円入道親王)

 Court Lady: Fujiwara Kimiko (藤原公子) or Sochi-no-Tsubone (帥局), Fujiwara no Kimishige’s daughter – former nanny of Takakura
 First daughter: Imperial Princess Isako (功子内親王; b. 1176) – Saigū of Ise

 Court Lady: Kogō-no-Tsubone (小督局; b. 1157), Fujiwara no Shigenori’s daughter
 Second daughter: Imperial Princess Hanshi/ Noriko (範子内親王; 1177–1210) later Empress Dowager Bōmon-in (坊門院)

Events of Takakura's life 
Although Takakura was formally enthroned, the reality was that government affairs were controlled by his father and his father-in-law.

 1168 (Nin'an 3, 19th day of the 2nd month): In the 3rd year of Rokujō-tennōs reign (六条天皇3年), the emperor was deposed by his grandfather, and the succession (‘‘senso’’) was received by his cousin, the third son of the retired-Emperor Go-Shirakawa.
 1168 (Nin'an 3, 19th day of the 2nd month):  Emperor Takakura is said to have acceded to the throne (‘‘sokui’’), and he is proclaimed emperor.

Takakura had his own views on the role of Emperor.  He is said to have written:
"The Emperor is a ship.  His subjects are water.  The water enables a ship to float well, but sometimes the vessel is capsized by it.  His subjects can sustain an Emperor well, but sometimes they overthrow him."

Ex-Emperor Go-Shirakawa exercised the powers attendant the well-settled patterns of cloistered rule. Taira no Kiyomori, who was the father of the Empress, did whatever he pleased as de facto Regent.

 1172 (Jōan  2, 10th day of the 2nd month): Taira Kiyomori's daughter, Tokuko, becomes Takakura's consort.
 May 27, 1177 (Jishō 1,  28th day of the 4th month): A great fire in the capital was spread by high winds; and the palace was reduced to cinders.

 1178 (Jishō 2, 12th day of the 11th month): Takakura's consort, Taira-no Tokuko, gave birth to a son.  Kiyomori rejoiced; and all the officers of the court congratulated the parents.  In the next month, this infant was declared heir to Emperor Takakura.
 1180 (Jisho 4, 21st day of the 2nd month): Emperor Takakura abdicated.
 1180 (Jisho 4, 22nd day of the 4th month): Emperor Antoku's coronation ceremony.
 1180 (Jisho 4, 2nd day of the 6th month): Former-emperor Go-Shirakawa-in, former-emperor Takakura-in and Emperor Antoku leave Kyoto for Fukuhara-kyō.
 1180 (Jisho 4, 26th day of the 11th month): The capital is moved back to Kyoto from Fukuhara.
 1180 (Jisho 4): A devastating whirlwind causes havoc in Heian-kyō, the capital.
 1181 (Jisho 5, 14th day of the 1st month): Emperor Takakura died.

Soon after the birth of Emperor Takakura's son, Prince Tokihito, he was pressured to abdicate.  The one-year-old infant would become Emperor Antoku.

Kugyō
Kugyō (公卿) is a collective term for the most powerful men attached to the court of the Emperor of Japan in pre-Meiji eras.

In general, this elite group included only three to four men at a time.  These were hereditary courtiers whose experience and background would have brought them to the pinnacle of a life's career.  During Takakura's reign, this apex of the  Daijō-kan included:
 Sesshō, Matsuo Motofusa, 1144–1230.
 Kampaku, Konoe Motomichi, 1160–1233.
 Daijō-daijin, Fujiwara Tadamasa.
 Daijō-daijin, Fujiwara Moronaga, 1137–1192.
 Sadaijin, Ōimikado Tsunemune, 1119–1189.
 Udaijin, Kujō Kanezane, 1149–1207.
 Nadaijin, Konoe Motomichi.
 Nadaijin, Minamoto Masamichi, died 1175.
 Nadaijin, Taira Shigemori, 1138–1179.
 Dainagon

Eras of Takakura's reign
The years of Takakura's reign are more specifically identified by more than one era name or nengō.
 Kaō         (1169–1171)
 Jōan (1171–1175)
 Angen           (1175–1177)
 Jishō       (1177–1181)

Cultural references
Takakura is the "Imperial Sovereign" of the Japan-inspired land of Akatsurai in Book 6: "The Lords of the Rising Sun" in the Fabled Lands adventure gamebook series.  He is portrayed as a young man with little real power, it being largely in the hands of his chancellor, "Lord Kiyomori".

Ancestry

See also

 Emperor of Japan
 List of Emperors of Japan
 Imperial cult

Notes

References
 Brown, Delmer M. and Ichirō Ishida, eds. (1979).  Gukanshō: The Future and the Past. Berkeley: University of California Press. ; OCLC 251325323
 Helmolt, Hans Ferdinand and James Bryce Bryce. (1907). The World's History: A Survey of Man's Progress. Vol. 2.  London: William Heinemann.OCLC 20279012
 Kitagawa, Hiroshi and Burce T. Tsuchida, ed. (1975). The Tale of the Heike. Tokyo: University of Tokyo Press.  OCLC 164803926
 Ponsonby-Fane, Richard Arthur Brabazon. (1959).  The Imperial House of Japan. Kyoto: Ponsonby Memorial Society. OCLC 194887
 Titsingh, Isaac. (1834). Nihon Odai Ichiran; ou,  Annales des empereurs du Japon.  Paris: Royal Asiatic Society, Oriental Translation Fund of Great Britain and Ireland. OCLC 5850691
 Varley, H. Paul. (1980).  Jinnō Shōtōki: A Chronicle of Gods and Sovereigns. New York: Columbia University Press. ; OCLC 59145842

Japanese emperors
1161 births
1181 deaths
12th-century Japanese monarchs
People of Heian-period Japan